FK Tønsberg was a football club from Tønsberg, Norway, founded on 10 October 2001 as a cooperation project between 20 local clubs. The new team replaced Eik-Tønsberg in the Norwegian Second Division beginning in the 2002 season. The first player to sign for the team was Anders Skarbøvik, the former team captain. They currently play in the Third Division.

FK Tønsberg came second in their Second Division group in 2002 and 2003. In 2004 they hired experienced coach Reine Almqvist, won the group and was promoted to the First Division.  They were relegated after only one season. They have since fluctuated between the Second and Third Divisions.

On 1 January 2020, FK Tønsberg merged with Eik-Tønsberg and became part of FK Eik Tønsberg.

Head coaches
Steinar Skeie (2002–03)
Reine Almqvist (2004–05)
Per Egil Swift (2006–08)
Tor Thodesen (2008-2010)
Hein Irgens Henriksen (2011-)

History 
{|class="wikitable"
|-bgcolor="#efefef"
! Season
! 
! Pos.
! Pl.
! W
! D
! L
! GS
! GA
! P
!Cup
!Notes
|-
|2002
|2. divisjon
|align=right |2
|align=right|26||align=right|16||align=right|6||align=right|4
|align=right|76||align=right|28||align=right|54
||First round
|
|-
|2003
|2. divisjon
|align=right |2
|align=right|26||align=right|12||align=right|10||align=right|4
|align=right|57||align=right|35||align=right|46
||Second round
|
|-
|2004
|2. divisjon
|align=right bgcolor="#DDFFDD"| 1
|align=right|26||align=right|20||align=right|2||align=right|4
|align=right|70||align=right|21||align=right|62
||Second round
|Promoted
|-
|2005
|1. divisjon
|align=right bgcolor="#FFCCCC"| 15
|align=right|30||align=right|6||align=right|7||align=right|17
|align=right|36||align=right|56||align=right|25
||Third round
|Relegated
|-
|2006
|2. divisjon
|align=right |4
|align=right|26||align=right|14||align=right|8||align=right|4
|align=right|61||align=right|26||align=right|50
||Second round
|
|-
|2007
|2. divisjon
|align=right |2
|align=right|26||align=right|15||align=right|8||align=right|3
|align=right|72||align=right|31||align=right|53
||Third round
|
|-
|2008
|2. divisjon
|align=right |3
|align=right|26||align=right|17||align=right|4||align=right|5
|align=right|75||align=right|35||align=right|55
||Second round
|
|-
|2009
|2. divisjon
|align=right |3
|align=right|26||align=right|17||align=right|2||align=right|7
|align=right|81||align=right|39||align=right|53
||First round
|
|-
|2010
|2. divisjon
|align=right |3
|align=right|26||align=right|13||align=right|7||align=right|6
|align=right|62||align=right|39||align=right|46
||Fourth round
|
|-
|2011 
|2. divisjon
|align=right |6
|align=right|26||align=right|13||align=right|3||align=right|10
|align=right|48||align=right|50||align=right|42
||Second round
|
|-
|2012 
|2. divisjon
|align=right |11
|align=right|26||align=right|10||align=right|3||align=right|13
|align=right|32||align=right|52||align=right|31
||First round
|
|-
|2013
|2. divisjon
|align=right bgcolor="#FFCCCC"| 13
|align=right|26||align=right|5||align=right|5||align=right|16
|align=right|44||align=right|67||align=right|20
||Second round
|Relegated
|-
|2014 
|3. divisjon
|align=right |2
|align=right|26||align=right|19||align=right|2||align=right|5
|align=right|94||align=right|31||align=right|59
||Second qual. round
|
|-
|2015
|3. divisjon
|align=right bgcolor="#DDFFDD"| 1
|align=right|26||align=right|25||align=right|0||align=right|1
|align=right|109||align=right|19||align=right|75
||First round
|Promoted
|-
|2016
|2. divisjon
|align=right bgcolor="#FFCCCC"| 10
|align=right|26||align=right|10||align=right|6||align=right|10
|align=right|38||align=right|41||align=right|36
||Second round
|Relegated
|-
|2017
|3. divisjon
|align=right |4
|align=right|26||align=right|11||align=right|7||align=right|8
|align=right|48||align=right|41||align=right|40
||First round
|
|-
|2018
|3. divisjon
|align=right |4
|align=right|26||align=right|13||align=right|7||align=right|6
|align=right|54||align=right|30||align=right|46
||First qual. round
|
|-
|2019
|3. divisjon
|align=right |2
|align=right|26||align=right|16||align=right|4||align=right|6
|align=right|56||align=right|25||align=right|52
||First round
|
|}

References

External links
Official site
Oseberget - Supporters

Defunct football clubs in Norway
Association football clubs disestablished in 2020
Sport in Vestfold og Telemark
Tønsberg
Association football clubs established in 2001
2001 establishments in Norway